A Flame in My Heart is a 1987 erotic psychological drama film directed by Alain Tanner.

Cast
  as Mercédès
 Benoît Régent as Pierre
  as Johnny
 André Marcon as Etienne
 Douglas Ireland as American friend
  as director
 Biana as props woman
 Jean-Yves Berteloot as comedian

References

External links
 
 

1987 films
1987 drama films
1980s erotic drama films
1980s French-language films
1980s psychological drama films
Films about sex addiction
Films directed by Alain Tanner
French erotic drama films
French psychological drama films
Swiss drama films
French-language Swiss films
1980s French films